The 1981 European Marathon Cup was the 1st edition of the European Marathon Cup of athletics and were held in Agen, France.

Team

Individual men

Individual women

References

Results
European Cup 1981. Association of Road Racing Statisticians. Retrieved 2018-04-15.

External links
 EAA web site

European Marathon Cup
European
International athletics competitions hosted by France
1981 in French sport